Farangipet or Farangipete is a locality in Mangalore city, Karnataka, India.
The ancient, first church, Monte Mariano Church, is located in Farangipet. It also has a temple and mosque nearby. Farangipet is a fast-growing town and it is between two main cities, namely Mangalore and B.C Road.
Farangipet comes under Pudu Gram Panchayat.    
Farangipet is famous for fish since the fish available here is fresh and cheap.

Localities in Mangalore